California's 5th State Senate district is one of 40 California State Senate districts. It is currently represented by Democrat Susan Eggman.

District profile 
The district is centered on the northern end of the San Joaquin Valley and forms the gateway between the Delta, the San Francisco Bay Area, the Sacramento metropolitan area, and Gold Country.

Sacramento County – 1.9%
 Galt

All of San Joaquin County
 Escalon
 Lathrop
 Lodi
 Manteca
 Ripon
 Stockton
 Tracy

Stanislaus County – 44.2%
 Modesto – 88.5%
 Riverbank

Election results from statewide races

List of senators 
Due to redistricting, the 5th district has been moved around different parts of the state. The current iteration resulted from the 2011 redistricting by the California Citizens Redistricting Commission.

Election results 1992 - present

2020

2016

2012

2008

2004

2000

1996

1992

See also 
 California State Senate
 California State Senate districts
 Districts in California

References

External links 
 District map from the California Citizens Redistricting Commission

05
Government of Sacramento County, California
Government of San Joaquin County, California
Government of Stanislaus County, California
Lodi, California
Modesto, California
Stockton, California
Tracy, California